Fed Up may refer to:

Film, TV and media
 Fed Up (film), a 2014 American documentary film about obesity and sugar
 Fed Up! (2002 film), documentary about GM foods starring Vandana Shiva
 Fed-Up Party, puppet Ed the Sock's joke political party
 Fed Up! (book), a book by Texas Governor Rick Perry

Music
Fed Up!, an American band

Songs
 "Fed Up" (DJ Khaled song)
"Fed Up", a song by Bounty Killer from the 1996 album My Xperience
"Fed Up", a song by House of Pain from the album Truth Crushed to Earth Shall Rise Again
"Fed Up", a 2007 song by Remi Nicole
"Fed Up", a song by The Dogs, see Music of Detroit

See also
J'en ai marre! (I'm Fed Up)